Can't Cope, Won't Cope is an Irish comedy-drama television series. It was created by Stefanie Preissner and produced for RTÉ2 in 2016. Seána Kerslake played fund manager Aisling and Nika McGuigan played art student Danielle. They are twenty-something friends from Mallow, County Cork, who share a house in Dublin. The first season was picked up by BBC 3 in 2017 and Netflix in the US, UK and Republic of Ireland in 2018. A second series was commissioned in 2017 and broadcast in 2018. The series also featured Amy Huberman. In August 2018, writer Stefanie Preissner confirmed that a third series would not be made, thus ending the series.

Cast
 Seána Kerslake as Aisling O'Dowd 
 Danika McGuigan as Danielle Mullane 
 Amy Huberman as Kate  
 Sheila Moylette as Lorraine 
 Muiris Crowley as Ferg 
 Hannah Sheehan as Rachel
 Steve Blount as Taxi Good
 Laurence O'Fuarain as Lorcan (series 1) 
 Lesa Thurman as Jennifer (series 1)
 Seán Óg Cairns as Austin (series 2)
 Peter Campion as Joe (series 2)

Episodes

Series 1 (2016)

Series 2 (2018)

References

2016 Irish television series debuts
2010s comedy-drama television series
Casual sex in television
Television shows set in Dublin (city)
English-language television shows
Infidelity in television
Irish comedy-drama television series
Mallow, County Cork
RTÉ original programming
Television shows set in Vancouver